The Société entomologique de France, or French Entomological Society, is devoted to the study of insects. The society was founded in 1832 in Paris, France.

The society was created by eighteen Parisian entomologists on January 31, 1832. The first (honorary) president was Pierre André Latreille (1762-1833) who was elected unanimously and established the goal of the society to contribute to and progress the development of entomology in all its aspects. The main publications of the society are Bulletin de la Société entomologique de France, Annales de la Société entomologique de France and, for a few years, L'Entomologiste, Revue d'Amateurs. The library contains 15,000 volumes and 1,500 titles of old or current literature.

Lists
 List of presidents of the Société entomologique de France

External links
 Société Entomologique de France
 BHL Annales
 Annales
 Annales de la société entomologique de France in Gallica, the digital library of the BnF.

References

Entomological societies
Non-profit organizations based in France
Organizations based in Paris
Organizations established in 1832
1832 establishments in France